A receiver general (or receiver-general) is an officer responsible for accepting payments on behalf of a government, and for making payments to a government on behalf of other parties.

See also
 Treasurer
 Receiver General for Canada
 Receiver General of Cornwall
 Receiver-General of the Duchy of Lancaster
 Receiver General of the Isle of Man
 Receiver General of Jamaica

Government occupations
Political office-holders